Carll House is a historic home located on Deer Park Avenue across from the vicinity of the intersection with Wolf Hill Road in Dix Hills in Suffolk County, New York. It was built about 1750 and is a -story, five bay gable roof residence with a -story side addition. Also on the property are three contributing 19th century barns, a small pond, and cottage. It was added to the National Register of Historic Places in 1985.

References

Houses on the National Register of Historic Places in New York (state)
Houses completed in 1750
Houses in Suffolk County, New York
National Register of Historic Places in Suffolk County, New York